Martin Correctional Institution  is a state prison for adult men located in Indiantown, Martin County, Florida, operated by the Florida Department of Corrections.  

Martin Correctional Institution opened in 1985 and has a maximum capacity of 1,509 prisoners.  The facility has a mix of security levels, including minimum, medium, close, and community.

In 2019 prisoner Scott Whitney released some clandestine film he took of the facility.

References

Prisons in Florida
Buildings and structures in Martin County, Florida
1985 establishments in Florida